Limea pygmaea is a species of bivalve mollusc in the family Limidae, the file shells or file clams.

References 

 SealifeBase
 Photo
 Photo
 
 Powell A. W. B., New Zealand Mollusca, William Collins Publishers Ltd, Auckland, New Zealand 1979 
 Dell, R. K. (1990). Antarctic Mollusca with special reference to the fauna of the Ross Sea. Bulletin of the Royal Society of New Zealand, Wellington 27: 1–311 page(s): 55
 Huber M. (2010) Compendium of bivalves. A full-color guide to 3,300 of the world’s marine bivalves. A status on Bivalvia after 250 years of research. Hackenheim: ConchBooks. 901 pp

Limidae
Bivalves described in 1845